Mothers and Sons may refer to:

 Mothers and Sons (book), a 2006 collection of short stories by Colm Tóibín
 Mothers and Sons (play), a 2014 play by Terrence McNally